Walk Through Fire may refer to:
 Walk Through Fire (Raven album)
 Walk Through Fire (Yola album)
 "Walk Through Fire", a song by Bad Company from the album Holy Water
 "Walk Through Fire", a song by Olivia Newton-John from the album The Rumour

See also
 Walk Through the Fire, an album by Mark Karan